The Mark II Purple Singles is a compilation album by Deep Purple. The album was released in 1979. It claimed to be MkII not just because it was the second line-up of the band but also because it was the second Deep Purple singles album after Singles As & Bs. The tracks were recorded during 1971 and 1972. A version with purple vinyl is also available.

The original sleeve notes by Geoff Barton claimed that "Smoke on the Water" was a different recording to the one from Made in Japan. He wrote: "Blackmore chooses to play the solo straight, without the embellishments that, for me, marred the other officially available live version [on Made in Japan]." In fact it is the same recording, edited.

Track listing
All songs written by Blackmore/Gillan/Glover/Lord/Paice.
Side one
"Smoke on the Water" – 5:12 (live version from Made in Japan, edited)
"Black Night" – 4:56 (live version recorded in Japan 1972)
"Child in Time" – 9:52 (live version from Made in Japan, edited)

Side two
"Woman from Tokyo" – 4:28 (A-side from Who Do We Think We Are, edited)
"Never Before" – 3:30 (A-side from Machine Head, edited)
"When a Blind Man Cries" – 3:29 (B-side from the Machine Head sessions)
"Painted Horse" – 5:18 (outtake from the Who Do We Think We Are sessions)

Personnel

Deep Purple
Ian Gillan – vocals, harmonica
Ritchie Blackmore – guitar
Jon Lord – organ, keyboards
Roger Glover – bass
Ian Paice – drums

Charts

References

1979 compilation albums
Deep Purple compilation albums